The Story of Mouseland was a story first told by Clarence Gillis, and later and most famously by Tommy Douglas, leader of the Saskatchewan Co-operative Commonwealth Federation that became the New Democratic Party of Canada, both social democratic parties. It was a political fable expressing the CCF's view that the Canadian political system was flawed in offering voters a false dichotomy: the choice of two parties, neither of which represented their interests.

The mice voted in black cats, which represented the Progressive Conservative Party, and then they found out how hard life was. Then they voted in the white cats, which symbolized the Liberal Party and things were different, but still not good for mice, because the government was still run by cats. The story goes on, and a mouse gets an idea that mice should run their government, not the cats. This mouse was accused of being a Bolshevik, and imprisoned. The moral of the story: you can lock up a mouse or a person, but you cannot lock up an idea.

A variation of this story is told in Douglas Adams' novel So Long, and Thanks for All the Fish, involving a democracy where people vote for lizards as their leaders. No one is happy with this situation, except for the lizards, but the people continue voting for the lizards "because if they didn't vote for a lizard ... the wrong lizard might get in".

In 2006, Brad Wall, Leader of the Saskatchewan Party, the opposition party in Saskatchewan, parodied Mouseland, a place in which the mice govern as destructive creatures, as an attack on the Saskatchewan New Democratic Party. In 2010, Wall carried his parody further by giving "A Mouseland Update" to the Saskatchewan Party's Annual Convention.

See also
 Lesser of two evils principle

References

External links
Video Animation of Mouseland
The Story of Mouseland (Audio clip from CBC Radio Broadcast)
The Story of Mouseland (Introduction, audio clip, transcript, and description)
Mouseland – A Political fable told by Tommy Douglas 1944
Brad Wall parody of Mouseland (RealPlayer required) 

20th-century speeches
New Democratic Party (Canada)
Canadian political phrases
Political history of Canada